Andrew Hamilton (born 16 March 1967), nicknamed The Hammer, is an English professional darts player who plays in Professional Darts Corporation events.

Career

Early career
Hamilton started playing darts at the age of 14 with his father Jim and brother Darren. By the age of 18, Hamilton was playing county level darts for Cheshire. However, he did not feel confident enough to pursue a career at the higher level and stopped playing competitive darts for 20 years.

2004–2007 
Hamilton made his television debut at the 2004 UK Open but was eliminated in the first round 5–2 by Eddie Lovely. His first semi-final on the PDC Pro Tour came in just his fourth event when he was beaten 3–2 by Mark Dudbridge in a Scottish Players Championship.

Hamilton qualified for the PDC World Championship for the first time in 2005 and made an immediate impact by reaching the quarter-final stage. Hamilton defeated Mark Thomson and Mick Manning 3–0 in the early rounds and beat former BDO World Champion Steve Beaton 4–2 to reach the last 16. After beating Josephus Schenk 4–1 in the fourth round, Hamilton eventually lost 5–1 to Bob Anderson.
He overcame Wes Newton and Mark Robinson to reach the last 32 of the UK Open, but was beaten 11–4 by Mark Walsh. He also qualified for the Las Vegas Desert Classic for the first time where Darin Young defeated him 2–0 in the opening round.

The 2006 World Championship saw Hamilton gain revenge for his defeat to Anderson last year with a 3–2 first round win. He also knocked out Terry Jenkins 4–1 in the subsequent round. However, Hamilton fell to eventual winner Phil Taylor in the third round losing 4–0. Hamilton did manage to gain a share of the prize for highest three-dart checkout by hitting a 170 finish, a feat matched by Taylor. Hamilton reached the quarter-finals of the Las Vegas Desert Classic before being eliminated by eventual runner-up Raymond van Barneveld 3–1. He had defeated Kevin Painter 6–4 and enjoyed a comprehensive 3–0 victory over Matt Clark in the prior rounds. Hamilton made his Winter Gardens debut at the World Matchplay tournament. He sprang something of a surprise in round one by thrashing number four seed Peter Manley 10–2 and then overcame Adrian Lewis in the second round, the duo produced a thrilling match that eventually saw Hamilton triumph 15–13. Hamilton's fine run continued as he defeated crowd favourite Wayne Mardle 16–9 to reach his first major semi-final. However Taylor, a seven time World Matchplay champion, eliminated Hamilton 17–11 in the semi-finals.

2007–2011 

Hamilton reached the semi-finals of the 2007 PDC World Championship before bowing out 6–0 to eventual runner-up Taylor. Hamilton's campaign began with a 4–3 victory over Mark Dudbridge before defeating Dennis Priestley 4–1 and Jenkins 5–4 in the quarter-finals. He hit 46 180s during the tournament, second only to the overall winner Raymond van Barneveld.
Later in the month, Hamilton picked up his first PDC Pro Tour title with a 3–1 win over Colin Lloyd in a Gibraltar Players Championship. He had already overcome Andy Smith, Roland Scholten, Jenkins and Alan Warriner-Little on his way to the final. He maintained his form by reaching two semi-finals in Pro Tour events and won his second title in April by beating James Wade in a UK Open Qualifier. Hamilton also made a big impact in the inaugural US Open by winning through to the semi-finals where he was defeated by Van Barneveld. Another semi-final soon followed at the World Darts Trophy, but Hamilton fell agonisingly short of reaching his first major final as he was edged out 6–5 by Gary Anderson.

Hamilton qualified for the first staging of the Grand Slam of Darts by virtue of reaching the semi-finals at the Circus Tavern earlier in the year. Hamilton's fast ascent in the world of darts continued as he won six matches to reach the final where, despite averaging over 100 against Taylor, he lost 18–11.

Hamilton reached the later stages of several tournaments, namely quarter-finals in the 2008 Las Vegas Classic and World Grand Prix. One year later he reached the semi-final of the World Grand Prix. In 2010 he continued the good results at the World Grand Prix reaching the quarter-finals. At the 2011 World Matchplay he reached the semi-final by beating Gary Anderson, John Henderson, and after being 15-8 down against Simon Whitlock, he pulled back and won the game 17–15, winning 9 legs in a row in a remarkable comeback. However he eventually lost to Phil Taylor 17–9 in the Semi finals.

2012–2015 
At the 2012 World Championship he beat Antonio Alcinas 3–2 in the first round, while missing a dart at double 18 in the third set for a nine-dart finish.
He then beat Vincent van der Voort 4–3, Dave Chisnall 4–0, and Kim Huybrechts 5–2, to reach the semi-finals for the second time in his career. He played Simon Whitlock and found himself 3–5 down and on the brink of elimination before he produced a super fightback, which included four ton-plus finishes, to prevail 6–5. Hamilton was consistently outscored by the Australian, but his finishing proved to be crucial as he hit 58% of his doubles to secure his first World final and second major TV final. The 200–1 outsider at the start of the tournament could not complete a remarkable victory and clinch the title, however, as he valiantly fought hard throughout but could never get ahead of his opponent, Adrian Lewis, who won the match 7–3. The £100,000 Hamilton picked up for his runner-up spot is the biggest of his career to date and he vowed to go one better in the 2013 tournament. He rose to world number 7 after the event.

His performance at the World Championship helped him gain a wildcard place into the 2012 Premier League Darts, where he made his first appearance.
On the first night he beat James Wade 8–5, but then did not win another game until the eighth fixture of the campaign which included three successive defeats. However, Hamilton turned his form around and went into the last round of matches knowing a win coupled with results going his way would see him into the play-offs. Hamilton thrashed fellow debutant Kevin Painter 8–1 and did qualify for the play-offs by finishing 3rd in the league. He was unbeaten in the last five matches of the season and played Whitlock in the semi-finals, against whom he drew 7–7 and then beat 8–4 during the league stage. Hamilton led the match 4–1, with Whitlock's solitary leg being a nine-darter, but went on to lose 6–8.

Hamilton then lost 5–9 in the last 32 of the UK Open to Raymond van Barneveld. He reached the final of the tenth Players Championship of the year and held a 5–3 lead over his opponent Colin Lloyd, before losing 5–6. At the World Matchplay he beat Dolan and Mark Webster, but was then defeated 11–16 in the quarter-finals by Phil Taylor. Hamilton won through to his second Players Championship final of the year at the 12th event in September, but lost 4–6 to Simon Whitlock. He then beat Webster and Steve Beaton to make the quarter-finals of the World Grand Prix. Hamilton faced Michael van Gerwen and despite making a 160 finish to force a deciding set, he lost 2–3. Hamilton topped his group at the Grand Slam of Darts by winning all three of his games, before taking out four ton-plus finishes to edge past Gary Anderson 10–9. He beat John Part 16–12 in the quarter-finals, and led van Barneveld 6–3 in the semis, before the Dutchman put together a match defining run of nine straight legs and eventually triumphed 16–10. After all 33 ProTour events of 2012 had been played, Hamilton was 14th on the Order of Merit, which qualified him for the Players Championship Finals where he saw off Andy Smith and van Gerwen to play Taylor in the quarter-finals. Hamilton led 9–5 in the best of 19 legs match, on the verge of beating the 15-time world champion for the first time in a televised match, but Taylor came back and with the score at 9–8, Hamilton needed 60 for the match. He missed the board with his first dart and missed double 20 with his last, this being the only dart he had for the match as he lost 9–10.

Hamilton dropped one set in each of his first three games in the 2013 World Championship as he reached the quarter-finals. He played Taylor and lost 0–5, winning just two legs during the match. He threw a nine-dart finish in the third UK Open Qualifier of the year during a third round victory over Tony West, but lost in the following round to Richie Burnett 4–6. By reaching the semi-finals of the 2012 Premier League, Hamilton qualified for the 2013 edition. In week six he enjoyed a 7–3 win over Taylor with an average of 101.40, but he lost six of his last seven matches to finish seventh in the league. Hamilton reached the third major final of his career at the UK Open by producing a superb performance to beat Wade 10–8 in the quarter-finals and survived six match darts from van Barneveld in the semis to win 10–9. He averaged 97 in the final against Taylor who averaged almost 10 points more as he won 11–4. Hamilton vowed to win his first major title following the defeat. He reached the final of the sixth Players Championship two weeks later, but lost 6–1 to van Gerwen meaning he had now not won a ranking event since 2007. Hamilton hit six out of six doubles against Huybrechts in the first round of the World Grand Prix in a 2–0 set win and then beat Painter 3–1 to ensure he reached at least the quarter-final stage of a major for the ninth consecutive tournament. He played Justin Pipe and could only average 75.88 in the double start event and lost 3–1. Hamilton qualified from Group 2 of the Championship League by defeating van Gerwen 6–5 to advance to the Winners Group where he could only win two of his seven games to finish seventh in the table. Hamilton survived a record 18 missed match darts from Part in the first round of the Players Championship Finals as he fought back from 5–1 down to win 6–5 with a 158 checkout and an average of just 75.05. More routine wins over Brendan Dolan and Ian White followed before Van Gerwen defeated Hamilton 10–5 in the semi-finals.

In the second round of the 2014 World Championship, Hamilton was defeated 4–1 by Burnett. His early exit, coupled with losing the £100,000 on the Order of Merit from reaching the final two years previously, meant he dropped to world number 11 after the event. Hamilton did not receive a wildcard to compete in the Premier League this year. He won his first ranking title since 2007 at the first UK Open Qualifier in February by defeating Lewis 6–2 in the final whilst averaging 105.27. At the UK Open he lost 9–5 in the fourth round to van Gerwen. At the World Matchplay, he lost in 13–10 the second round to Chisnall.
Hamilton reached the semi-final stage of the European Darts Trophy where he lost to the eventual winner Michael Smith. He was knocked out in the first round of the remaining four major events of the year and could not get out of his group at the Grand Slam, meaning he failed to reach a single major quarter-final this season having reached seven in 2012 and six in 2013.

2015–2018 
Hamilton met Peter Wright in the third round of the 2015 World Championship and was thrashed 4–0. He lost 9–8 to Kim Huybrechts in the fourth round of the UK Open. After beating Raymond van Barneveld 10–7 in the opening round of the World Matchplay, Hamilton described his play over the last six months as horrible. He went on to lose 13–6 to Phil Taylor in the second round and, after dropping out of the top 16 on the Order of Merit, he failed to qualify for any of the remaining major events in 2015.

Hamilton missed three darts to eliminate Joe Murnan 3–1 in the first round of the 2016 World Championship. The match instead went to a deciding set in which Hamilton missed one dart to force a sudden death leg. It was his first opening round exit in the event after securing at least a second round showing in all of his previous 11 World Championships. He qualified for the third round of the UK Open, but lost 9–2 to Kyle Anderson. 
He received an entry in to the Players Championship Finals when Anderson was unable to obtain a visa and he was defeated 6–1 by Michael van Gerwen in the opening round. During the course of the year one last 16 appearance was Hamilton's best run in an event.

Hamilton dropped out of the top 32 during 2016 which saw his 12-year run of playing in the World Championship come to an end. He was ranked 53rd on the Order of Merit after the event.

Hamilton lost his PDC tour card at the end of the 2017 season and made the decision to take a year off from playing PDC darts due to personal reasons. He did get through the Riley Pub qualifiers for PDC UK open but failed to make it past the second round.

2020 onwards

On 19 January 2020, Hamilton regained his PDC Tour Card by finishing fifth on the UK Q School Order of Merit. He will play on the Pro Tour in 2020 and 2021.

Hamilton entered the 2020 PDC UK Open in Round 2, but lost 4–6 in a quality match to Niels Zonneveld, despite averaging 97.49 against Zonneveld's 95.50.

Hamilton picked up £5,500 in total prize money from the Players Championship events he participated in, which placed him 101st in the qualifying order of merit for the 2020 Players Championship Finals race. This tournament includes only the Top 64, hence meaning that Hamilton failed to qualify.

Nevertheless, 'The Hammer' sealed spots in 2 of the 4 European Tour events held in 2020: the PDC Belgian Darts Championship and the International Darts Open, with respective earnings of £2,000 (Last 32) and £3,000 (Last 16). His defeats came to World Champion Peter Wright and the World Number 1 Michael Van Gerwen. Hamilton finished inside the Top 32 (29th) of the European Tour order of merit, securing a return to the 2020 European Championship - the first televised major played during COVID-19 circumstances in front of a crowd since the UK Open in March. Hamilton averaged 87.69 in a 6–1 loss to an inform Devon Petersen, but still picked up £6,000 and a boost in his ranking.

Hamilton will return for a start in Round 1 of the 2021 PDC World Darts Championship, having occupied the penultimate qualifying place on the Pro Tour order of merit for the World Championship. It is expected that the provisional minimal prize of £7,500 will elevate Hamilton in the main order of merit.

BDO

As part of his Decision to take a year out from the game Andy decided to enter major BDO tournaments from April 2018, reaching the Final of The BDO Welsh Open losing 6–3 to Mike Warbuton and the Quarter Final of the Belgium and Danish open. By the middle of August he had reached 27th in the BDO World Championship rankings giving him an outside shot of qualifying for the end of season event.

Darts business
Hamilton is sponsored by XQMax and Autonet insurance. Hamilton previously practiced with Phil Taylor, a fellow resident of Stoke-on-Trent but he now practices with Colin Osborne. Although he temporarily relocated to Derby to be closer to Osborne, Hamilton has since returned to Stoke-on-Trent.

Personal life
Away from the oche, Hamilton ran the Skylark pub in his home town Stoke-on-Trent, but soon sold the pub to pursue a full-time darts career.

In 2012, Hamilton, together with the seven other players who competed in the Premier League recorded a charity single with Chas Hodges and his band called "Got My Tickets for the Darts", written by Hodges. It was released on 18 May, the night after the play-offs at the O2 Arena in London, where it was premiered. Proceeds from the single were donated to the Haven House Children's Hospice.

World Championship results

PDC

2005: Quarter-finals (lost to Bob Anderson 1–5)
2006: Third round (lost to Phil Taylor 0–4)
2007: Semi-finals (lost to Phil Taylor 0–6)
2008: Second round (lost to Alex Roy 1–4)
2009: Third round (lost to Jelle Klaasen 1–4)
2010: Third round (lost to James Wade 3–4)
2011: Second round (lost to Robert Thornton 0–4)
2012: Runner-up (lost to Adrian Lewis 3–7)
2013: Quarter-finals (lost to Phil Taylor 0–5)
2014: Second round (lost to Richie Burnett 1–4)
2015: Third round (lost to Peter Wright 0–4)
2016: First round (lost to Joe Murnan 2–3)
2021: First round (lost to Nico Kurz 1–3)

BDO

 2019: Preliminary round (lost to David Cameron 0–3)
 2020: Second round (lost to Wayne Warren 1–4)

Career statistics

(W) Won; (F) finalist; (SF) semifinalist; (QF) quarterfinalist; (#R) rounds 6, 5, 4, 3, 2, 1; (RR) round-robin stage; (Prel.) Preliminary round; (DNQ) Did not qualify; (DNP) Did not participate; (NH) Not held

Performance timeline

PDC major finals: 3 (3 runners-up)

References

External links

English darts players
1967 births
Living people
Professional Darts Corporation former tour card holders
British Darts Organisation players
PDC ranking title winners